Delta Heavy (often stylised as DELTΔ HEΔVY) are an English drum and bass production duo consisting of Ben Hall and Simon James. They found fame with their 2012 single "Get By", which entered the UK Indie Chart at number 30. The duo's debut album, Paradise Lost, was released on 18 March 2016 through RAM Records.

Career history

2010–2014: Early beginnings and commercial breakthrough
Delta Heavy first signed to Viper Recordings in 2009, and provided the songs "Galaxy" and "Abort" for two of the label's compilations. They were picked up by the prestigious drum and bass label RAM Records in 2010, and released their first two singles, "Space Time" and "Overkill" with them. Their debut extended play, Down the Rabbit Hole, was released in May 2012. It entered the UK Dance Chart at number 37.

2014–present: Paradise Lost and Only in Dreams
On 2 November 2014, the group released the first single from their debut album, "Reborn". This was followed by "Ghost", released 17 July 2015. The song gained popularity due to its music video, which features an animated Clippit. The album's third single, "Punish My Love", features vocals from British singer Tanika, and was released 4 December 2015. The album's title and release date were announced on 14 January 2016; Paradise Lost was released on 18 March 2016. On 22 January, "City of Dreams" was released as an instant grat single for those who pre-ordered the album on iTunes. The album's fourth official single, "Oscillator", was released on 4 March, backed with "Fun House". "White Flag VIP", a variation in production of album track "White Flag", was released on 26 May 2016, backed with "Arcadia".

In March 2019, Delta Heavy released their sophomore album, Only in Dreams, which includes collaborations with artists such as Zeds Dead, Modestep, Muzzy, and Kuuro.

Discography

Studio albums

EPs

Singles

Promotional singles

Other appearances

Remixes

Accolades and awards

References

External links

Official website

English electronic music duos
British drum and bass music groups
Dubstep music groups
Drum and bass duos
Record production duos
Remixers
Monstercat artists
RAM Records artists
British record production teams